This is a list of the first women lawyer(s) and judge(s) in Utah. It includes the year in which the women were admitted to practice law (in parentheses). Also included are women who achieved other distinctions such becoming the first in their state to graduate from law school or become a political figure.

Firsts in Utah's history

Lawyers 

First females: Phoebe Couzins and Georgia Snow (1872) 
First female from Utah to practice before the U.S. Supreme Court: Agnes Swan around 1912
 First female to practice before the U. S. District Court for the District of Utah: Beryl Bonner Meyers (1926) 
First Asian American female: Eunice Chen (1973) 
First Native American female: Mary Ellen Sloan (1975)
First Hispanic American female: Sheila K. McCleve (1977): 
First African American female: Denise M. Mercherson (1979)

State judges 

 First female: Reva Beck Bosone (1930) in 1936
 First female (Third Judicial District): Christine M. Durham (1978)
 First female (Utah Supreme Court): Christine M. Durham (1978) in 1982
First Hispanic American female: Frances M. Palacios (1980) in 1992  
 First African American female: Shauna Graves-Robertson (1990) in 1999
 First female (Fourth Judicial District): Claudia Laycock in 2001  
 First female (Chief Justice; Utah Supreme Court): Christine M. Durham (1978) in 2002
 First female (Tenth Circuit Court of Appeals): Carolyn B. McHugh (1982) in 2014  
 First openly LGBT (female): Camille Neider in 2017

Federal judges 
 First female (U.S. Bankruptcy Court): Judith Boulden (1974) in 1988 
 First female (U.S. District Court for the District of Utah): Tena Campbell (1977) in 1995

Attorney General 

 First female: Jan Graham (1980) from 1993-2001

United States Attorney

 First Latino American female (Acting United States Attorney for the District of Utah): Andrea T. Martinez in 2021

Bar Associations

First female president (Utah State Bar): Pamela Greenwood (1972) in 1990 
First minority (female) president (Utah State Bar): Angelina Tsu in 2015
First female president (Utah chapter–Federal Bar Association): Christine Fitzgerald Soltis (1975)

Firsts in local history
 Claudia Laycock: First female district court judge in Juab, Millard, Utah and Wasatch Counties, Utah (2001)
 Christine M. Durham  (1978): First female district court judge for Salt Lake, Summit and Tooele Counties, Utah (1978)
 Cheryl Ann Russell (1976): First female lawyer in Logan, Utah [Cache County, Utah]
 Reva Beck Bosone (1930): First female lawyer in Carbon County, Utah
 Patricia Geary: First female to become the County Attorney for Emery County, Utah (c. 1992)
 Rebekah W. Hornbein (c. 1915): First female law graduate from the University of Utah [Salt Lake County, Utah]
Margret Sidwell Taylor (1970): First female to work as a lawyer for the Public Defender's Office for Salt Lake County, Utah
Sheila K. McCleve (1977): First female to work as a full-time prosecutor in Salt Lake City, Utah
Patricia J. Marlowe (1973): First female to serve as the Deputy County Attorney for Salt Lake City, Utah [Salt Lake County, Utah]
Elizabeth Kronk Warner: First (Native American) female to serve as the Dean of the S.J. Quinney College of Law (2019)
Barbara G. Hjelle: First resident female lawyer in Washington County, Utah
 Karla Staheli: First female judge in Fifth District Court serving Juvenile Court in Washington County, Utah

See also  

 List of first women lawyers and judges in the United States
 Timeline of women lawyers in the United States
 Women in law

Other topics of interest 

 List of first minority male lawyers and judges in the United States
 List of first minority male lawyers and judges in Utah

References  

Lawyers, Utan, first
Utan, first
Women, Utan, first
Women, Utah, first
Women in Utah
Utah lawyers
Lists of people from Utah